Austrarchaea dianneae is a species of spider in the family Archaeidae. It is endemic to Australia.

References 

Spiders described in 2011
Archaeidae